Moffa is a surname. Notable people with the surname include:

Marina Moffa (born 1964), Australian basketball player
Paolo Moffa (1915–2004), Italian film director, producer, and screenwriter
Silvano Moffa (born 1951), Italian politician and journalist

See also
Moffat (disambiguation)